The IAI Heron (Machatz-1) is a medium-altitude long-endurance unmanned aerial vehicle (UAV) developed by the Malat
(UAV) division of Israel Aerospace Industries. It is capable of Medium Altitude Long Endurance (MALE) operations of up to 52 hours' duration at up to 10.5 km (35,000 ft). It has demonstrated 52 hours of continuous flight, but the effective operational maximal flight duration is less, according to payload and flight profile. An advanced version, the Heron TP, is also known as the IAI Eitan.

On 11 September 2005, it was announced that the Israel Defense Forces purchased US$50 million worth of Heron systems.

Design and development
The Heron navigates using an internal GPS navigation device, and either a pre-programmed flight profile (in which case the system is fully autonomous from takeoff to landing), manual override from a ground control station, or a combination of both. It can autonomously return to base and land in case of lost communication with the ground station. The system has fully automatic launch and recovery (ALR) and all-weather capabilities.

The Heron is also capable of target acquisition and artillery adjustment.

The payload sensors communicate with the ground control station in real time, using either direct line of sight data link, or via an airborne/satellite relay. Like the navigation system, the payload can also be used in either a fully pre-programmed autonomous mode, or manual real-time remote operation, or a combination of both.

Super Heron
At the February 2014 Singapore Air Show, IAI unveiled the Super Heron refinement of the Heron UAS. The Super Heron has a 200-horsepower diesel engine that increases its rate of climb and performance.

Operational history 

The Heron saw significant use during Operation Cast Lead in Gaza of 2008–2009. During the deployment, each brigade combat team was assigned a UAV squadron for close support. This was the first Israeli operation in which UAVs, helicopters, and fighter jets were allocated to ground forces directly without IAF central command authorizing sorties. Air-support controller teams operated alongside brigade commanders at the front emphasizing the brigade commander's utilization of direct air assets. A high degree of situational awareness was achieved by maintaining at least a dozen UAVs in flight over Gaza at all times. Aerial surveillance was provided by Heron and Hermes 450 UAVs and Apache attack helicopters. Along with coordination between the air force and ground troops, Israeli ground forces were able to utilize cooperation with the Israel Security Agency by having operatives attached to the forward units. This inter-service coordination allowed for a higher level of tactical awareness and the ability to strike time-critical targets.

Other countries operating the Heron include Singapore, India and Turkey. France operates a derivative of Heron named Eagle or Harfang. In 2008, Canada announced a plan to lease a Heron for use in Afghanistan, starting in 2009. In mid-2009, Australia leased two Herons as part of a multimillion-dollar lease to operate the vehicles in Afghanistan. In early July 2013, the Heron reached 15,000 flight hours over Afghanistan. Australia concluded its use of the Heron in support of Operation Slipper in Afghanistan on 30 November 2014, after it had accumulated 27,000 flight hours. Royal Australian Air Force retired two Herons in June 2017.

Beginning in 2021, Malta-based Herons have been used by Frontex, the European Border and Coast Guard Agency, to monitor migrant activity in the southern Mediterranean Sea. This activity drew controversy when it was announced that the data gathered would be shared with countries including Libya and Tunisia. The concern was that the data could be used to force irregular migrants back to their point of departure, denying them the opportunity to seek asylum in other countries.

Heron variants 
Turkey operates a special variant of the Heron, which utilizes Turkish-designed and manufactured electro-optical subsystems. For example, the Turkish Herons use the ASELFLIR-300T airborne thermal Imaging and targeting system designed and manufactured by ASELSAN of Turkey. The Turkish Herons also have stronger engines in order to compensate for the added payload created by the heavier ASELFLIR-300T. This is the same FLIR system currently used in the TAI/AgustaWestland T129 attack helicopter and also the TAI Anka MALE UAV. IAI staff maintain that the Turkish Heron's "with its enhanced performance, is better than all existing Heron UAVs operating worldwide". Turkish Aerospace Industries (TUSAŞ) provides maintenance and overhaul services for its Herons.
 EADS Harfang – variant operated by France

Operators 
All exports of the IAI Heron are unarmed.

 Azerbaijani Air Forces – 5

 Brazilian Air Force – 15 operated jointly with Federal Police
 Brazilian Federal Police – 15 operated jointly with Air Force

 Royal Canadian Air Force – 2 in service as of 2011, formerly operated 3

 Ecuadorian Navy – 2

 European Border and Coast Guard Agency - at least 1

German Air Force – 3, including 2 ground stations on an initial one-year lease starting since 2010, with 2-3 more being planned. Will be replaced by the Eurodrone

 Hellenic Air Force - 2+1 on lease starting December 2019 which entered service in June 2021
 Hellenic Coast Guard

 Indian Army - 4 are on lease for 3 years from 2021
 Indian Air Force – 50. 49 on service, 1 crashed in 2017
 Indian Navy – 16

 Israeli Defence Force – at least 1

 Republic of Korea Army – 3 on order as of 2014

 Maltese Air Force - at least 1

 Royal Moroccan Air Force – three bought in 2014

 Republic of Singapore Air Force – 2

 Turkish Air Force – 10

 United States Navy – 2

 Vietnam People's Navy – 3 on order as of 2018

Former operators

 Royal Australian Air Force – 2, retired in 2017

Specifications

See also

References

External links 

 IAI Heron Official page
 IAI Heron Update
 MALE UAV Applications
 UAV Sensor applications
 EO Sensors for UAVs
 SAR sensors for UAVs
 Heron UAV News at DefenceTalk

1990s Israeli military reconnaissance aircraft
Heron
Twin-boom aircraft
Medium-altitude long-endurance unmanned aerial vehicles
Single-engined pusher aircraft